Maksim Babanin (born 7 October 1988) is a Russian professional boxer who won bronze medals at the 2017 European Championships and 2019 World Championships.

Amateur boxing career
Babanin began his amateur career in 2007. In 2007 he competed in the European Junior Championship in Sombor and became the super-heavyweight champion, beating Tyson Fury, who would later become world heavyweight champion. As of 2022, Babanin is the most recent boxer to defeat Fury in competition, who remains undefeated in professional boxing.

Between 2012 and 2017, Babanin competed in the World Series of Boxing, during which time he amassed a 9–3 record, and achieved a notable victory against Joe Joyce. In September 2019, Babanin participated in 2019 AIBA World Boxing Championships, competing in the super-heavyweight division. He earned his place in the semifinals by beating Fraser Clark on points, but lost his semifinal bout against Bakhodir Jalolov on points as well.

Between late November and early December of 2020, Babanin competed in the Russian super heavyweight tournament, which was held to determine the Russian boxing representatives. He was able to beat Damila Sharafutdinov by split decision in the round of 16, Mark Petrovsky on points in the quarterfinals, but lost on points to Svyatoslav Teterin in the semifinals.

Professional boxing career
Babanin made his professional debut against Bogdan Rakich on 26 November 2021. He won the fight by stoppage, as Rakich retired from the fight at the end of the third round. A month later, on 17 December 2021, Babanin was booked to face Olivier Dounda Mekongo. He won the fight by a second-round technical knockout.

Babanin faced Evgeny Kirichenko in his first fight of 2022, which took place on 29 January 2022. He won the fight by a second-round knockout.

Professional boxing record

References

1988 births
Living people
Russian male boxers
Sportspeople from Volgograd
AIBA World Boxing Championships medalists
Super-heavyweight boxers